Vernacular culture is the cultural forms made and organised by ordinary, often indigenous people, as distinct from the high culture of an elite. One feature of vernacular culture is that it is informal. Such culture is generally engaged in on a non-profit and voluntary basis, and is almost never funded by the state.

The term is used in the modern study of geography and cultural studies. It generally implies a cultural form that differs markedly from a deeply rooted folk culture, and also from tightly organised subcultures and religious cultures. In cultural and communication studies, vernacular rhetoric is the discursive aspect of vernacular culture, referring to "mundane, bottom-up, and informal discursive expressions that challenge and criticize the institutional".

Examples

 the making and shaping of personal gardens, market garden allotments
 amateur photography, family albums
 scrapbooking
 the making and showing of home movies
 self-organising creative circles, such as for knitting, sewing, quilting, storytelling, photography, dance, and painting
 amateur dramatics and youth dance groups
 local history and historical re-enactment groups
 book reading and discussion circles
 local horticultural produce and pet shows
 inventors groups, and leagues of amateur robot builders
 amateur beauty pageants
 local food networks and "annual dinners"
 informal investment clubs, which meet regularly in a social setting to jointly decide which stocks and investment vehicles to invest their money in
 fetes, parades, seasonal and traditional celebrations
 children's street culture
 parent-organised informal child sports and gym teams
 roadside shrines to traffic victims, and small self-made shrines at gravesites
 some forms of weblog, internet culture, or participatory media.

One could also include the design of home-made vernacular signage and notices

Some of these activities, such as gardens, family albums, and grave memorials, will be organized on a family basis. Larger activities are usually organized through informal variations of the British committee system, consisting of a chairman, secretary, treasurer, agenda, minutes, and an annual meeting with elections based on a quorum.

See also
 Vernacular (disambiguation)
 Vernacular dance
 Vernacular literature
 Vernacular architecture
 Spirit of place
 Grassroots
 Stuckism

References

Handicrafts
Cultural geography
Traditions
Cultural anthropology